Royal Air Force Grimsby or more simply RAF Grimsby is a former Royal Air Force station located near Grimsby, Lincolnshire, England. The site was operational during the Second World War as part of RAF Bomber Command initially as a satellite station for the Vickers Wellington bombers of RAF Binbrook. By early 1943 the station was equipped with Avro Lancaster bombers of No. 100 Squadron RAF.

Although the station was officially called RAF Grimsby, servicemen and locals referred to it as Waltham, the name of the nearby village Waltham.

History

Inter war years
Flying began at Waltham in 1933 when a grassed strip operated as Grimsby's municipal airport and a small aero club was formed at the airfield.

Second World War
In June 1938, the airfield's first military residents were RAF Bomber Command's 5 Group who set up a Royal Air Force Volunteer Reserve training outfit (No. 25 Elementary and Reserve Flying Training School RAF). The Civil Air Guard also operated from the aerodrome.

The airfield was requisitioned by the Air Ministry in May 1940. The aerodrome was then constructed through the summer of 1940 with concrete runways (the first in north Lincolnshire) to accommodate bombers of No. 1 Group RAF. It became operational in the summer of 1941 and was initially a satellite airfield for nearby RAF Binbrook. The Wellington squadrons based at Binbrook used Waltham as their own airfield initially only had grass runways.

Throughout the war the station was under 1 Group Bomber Command. Three squadrons served at RAF Grimsby during its operation: 142 Squadron moved to the airfield in November 1941; 100 Squadron arrived in December 1942; and 550 Squadron (formed from 100 Squadron's C-Flight).

The first operational sortie from Waltham for 100 Squadron was on the 4/5 March 1943. The squadron's Avro Lancaster bombers were sent on mine-laying sorties along the coasts of occupied Europe. Two Lancasters were lost.

The station was closed some weeks prior to the surrender of Germany and the hangars were used by No. 35 Maintenance Unit RAF for storage and the flying field reverted to back to agricultural use.

Post-Second World War
Years later the A16 was being improved and a bypass for the village of Holton-le-Clay cut into a large proportion of the station.

Memorials
Currently a memorial to 100 Squadron stands near the B1 hangar, next to the northern entrance to Holton-le-Clay. There is a memorial for 550 Squadron at the now disused station RAF North Killingholme and 142 Squadron is said to have a memorial in North Africa.

Buildings
Many of the airfield buildings still survive and are currently in use by a haulage firm and mechanics. Much of the original runway arrangement remains and is tarmaced. They have been painted with road markings in areas, for use with learner drivers, and provide a circuit regularly frequented by dog walkers. Out of the thirty plus dispersals built only one remains to this day. It is still possible to see the outlines of some from the air.

Notable surviving buildings include the control tower, crew locker and dryer rooms, the pre-war B1 and T2 hangars; however much of the station is in a state of disrepair and is also victim to fly-tipping. Old unused farm equipment also litters the station, it is overgrown with weeds and strewn with rubble.

A golf course, golf driving range and a go-karting track have been built on the station and a coal merchants stands on what was once the fuel dump. The bomb dump has totally disappeared and various buildings in the village of Waltham, Lincolnshire such as accommodation huts no longer exist. The only remaining building in the village is the Women's Auxiliary Air Force (WAAF) canteen and kitchen which currently house the Museum of Rural Life and RAF Grimsby Exhibition at the Waltham Windmill. This building has been extended.

RAF Grimsby photographs

References

Citations

Bibliography

External links

 Official RAF history
 Information about RAF Grimsby
 195 (GRIMSBY) Squadron ATC

Royal Air Force stations in Lincolnshire
Military history of Grimsby
Military units and formations established in 1938
Royal Air Force stations of World War II in the United Kingdom